The Lady Killer is the third studio album by American singer CeeLo Green. It was released November 5, 2010, by Elektra Records. Production for the album was handled by Salaam Remi, Element, The Smeezingtons, Fraser T. Smith, Paul Epworth, and Jack Splash.

The album debuted at number nine on the US Billboard 200 chart, selling 41,000 copies in its first week. It achieved respectable chart success elsewhere and produced three singles, including the international hit "Fuck You". The album has sold 498,000 copies in the United States as of October 2012, and it has been certified double Platinum in the United Kingdom. The Lady Killer received generally positive reviews from critics, who praised its production, classicist soul music approach, and Green's singing.

Recording 
Green reportedly "spent three years on The Lady Killer, recording close to 70 songs". Thirteen tracks that didn't make the final selection for The Lady Killer were leaked online in June 2010 as an album titled Stray Bullets including the song "You Don't Shock Me Anymore", and collaborations with The B-52's ("Cho Cho The Cat"), Soko (a remix of "I'll Kill Her"), and Goodie Mob ("Night Train").

Release and promotion 
The album was released on November 9, 2010, by Elektra Records. It was made available for streaming at NPR through to November 9, 2010.

Singles 
The album's lead single, "Fuck You", was released on August 19, 2010, and charted at number two on the US Billboard Hot 100. It also became an international hit and peaked within the top-10 of charts in several countries, including number one in the Netherlands and the United Kingdom. The radio edit of the song was entitled "Forget You", while another edit is simply entitled "FU". A music video for the song was released on YouTube on August 19, 2010, featuring the lyrics of the song appearing on different colored backgrounds with film grain overlaid on the video. The video went viral, receiving over two million views within a week of its release. The official music video was released on September 1, 2010.

The second single, "It's OK", was released on December 13, 2010. It charted on the UK Singles Chart, peaking at 20. "Fool for You" was solicited to radio as the album's third single on March 8, 2011. The album's fourth single, "Bright Lights Bigger City", was released on March 27, 2011. The album's fifth single, "I Want You", was released on June 5, 2011. "Cry Baby" was released as the album's sixth single on September 12. The seventh single and the first from The Platinum Edition of the album, "Anyway", was released on December 11.

Live performances 
Green toured during 2010 and 2011 with an all-female backing band named Scarlet Fever, performing for Taratata, Reeperbahn Festival, the BBC, Late Show with David Letterman, W's Symmetry Live Concert Series, Saturday Night Live, the Jimmy Kimmel Live! special show following the Academy Awards, and many other venues. Core band members included Sharon Aguilar (lead guitar, violin), Brittany Brooks (drums), Theresa Flaminio (keyboards, background vocals), and Regina Zernay Roberts (bass guitar, moog synthesizer).

Commercial performance 
The album debuted at number nine on the US Billboard 200 chart, with first-week sales of 41,000 copies in the United States. It also entered at number two on the US Top R&B/Hip-Hop Albums chart. As of October 2012, the album has sold 498,000 copies in the United States.

The Lady Killer attained moderate international charting. In the United Kingdom, the album debuted at number 10 on the Top 40 Albums, and it reached number one on the Top 40 RnB Albums chart. On November 4, 2011, The Lady Killer was certified double Platinum by the British Phonographic Industry, for shipments of 600,000 copies in the UK. As of December 2011, the album had sold 621,000 copies in the UK. It was the third biggest selling R&B / hip hop album of 2011 in the UK.

In Canada, it debuted at number 29 on the Top 100 Albums chart. It also entered at number 91 in Belgium, at number 18 in Ireland, at number 43 in the Netherlands, at number 24 in Australia, at number 90 in France, at number 53 in Sweden, and at number 16 in Scotland.

Critical reception 

The Lady Killer received rave reviews from critics. At Metacritic, which assigns a normalized rating out of 100 to reviews from mainstream publications, the album received an average score of 80, based on 33 reviews. AllMusic writer Andy Kellman called it "a thoroughly engrossing album". Entertainment Weeklys Leah Greenblatt commented that the album "both honors and tweaks the tropes of vintage songcraft with hefty doses of sweet Motown / Stax boogie, a smattering of Curtis Mayfield superfly, and imaginary theme songs for James Bond". Bill Friskics-Warren of The Washington Post wrote that it "offers some of the most ebullient pop this side of old-school hit-machines ranging from Holland–Dozier–Holland to Gamble and Huff". Chicago Tribune writer Greg Kot lauded Green's "retro-soul classicism and dark-tinged eccentricity". Slant Magazines Huw Jones praised the album's accessibility and "buoyant nü-Motown and progressive soul", while noting Green's singing as "absolutely flawless. Pitch-perfect from tip to toe". Rolling Stone writer Jody Rosen dubbed The Lady Killer "one of the most engrossing records of 2010".

In a mixed review, Jon Caramanica of The New York Times found Green to be "reduced to an accent piece [...] purposefully restrained", stating "Green's vocals are buried low in the mix, mere decoration for the arrangements and textures [...] crisp, lovely and certainly well rehearsed". Jer Fairall of PopMatters found the album's premise inconsistent, writing that it "feels relatively safe [...] a thoroughly likeable little trifle of a record", but added that "As a throwback, it is indeed impeccable". Despite viewing it as less "gleefully unhinged" than his previous work, NMEs Jason Draper cited it as Green's "most focused solo album". The Observers Killian Fox wrote that "his idiosyncrasies have proven too potent to repress". Nitsuh Abebe of New York called it "suitably theatrical—a lavishly orchestrated thing", and lauded Green's dramatist "lady-killer persona" and "artifice". Los Angeles Times writer Margaret Wappler noted "a glassy modernity that makes the album a sexy sonic adventure of loving and leaving" and commented that "it's not Green's caddish ways that charm. Rather [...] it's his big heart underneath".

Despite writing that "he's not always lethal", Pitchforks Joshua Klein commented that Green "manages to avoid being both too rough or too smooth", complimenting his "contemporary, confident conception of soul music" and the album's "de rigueur synthetic frills". Barry Walters of Spin noted its "detailed encapsulations of Saturday-night transcendence and Sunday-morning love pains" and its music "beautifully busy 21st-century Motown as greasy as it is vibrant". Amy Linden of The Village Voice called the album "romantic—chaste, even", writing that "[Green]'s written a manual on how to both break and mend someone's heart". The Independents Andy Gill commented that "he manages to avoid all the bubblebath boudoir-soul cliches that litter most R&B albums". Chicago Sun-Times writer Thomas Conner called it "an utter delight", writing that "every song rings fresh, modern, anthemic, packed with earth, wind and fire".

Accolades 
The Lady Killer was nominated for a Grammy Award for Best Pop Vocal Album, presented at the 54th Grammy Awards in 2012. The song "Fool for You", featuring Melanie Fiona, won Grammy Awards for Best Traditional R&B Performance and Best R&B Song. "Fuck You" won the Grammy Award for Best Urban/Alternative Performance and was nominated for Record of the Year and Song of the Year.

Track listing

The Platinum Edition
Green released The Platinum Edition of The Lady Killer on November 28, 2011. The repackaged album contains the single "Anyway", released on December 11, 2011, which will serve as the album's sixth overall single and first platinum edition single. Other new tracks include "Scarlet Fever" and the single version of "I Want You (Hold on to Love)". "Love Gun" and "No One's Gonna Love You" are also new for international markets. "Please" (featuring Selah Sue) was removed.

Notes
 (co.) denotes co-producer
 On the clean version of the album, the song "Fuck You" is renamed as "Forget You".

Personnel 
Credits for The Lady Killer adapted from AllMusic.

Musicians 

 Jo Allen – violin
 Max Baillie – viola
 Brody Brown – composer, musician
 Thomas Callaway – composer, executive producer, producer, vocals
 Mike Caren – A&R, musician
 Natalie Cavey – viola
 Stephanie Cavey – violin
 Dena Chutuk – background vocals
 Cathy Collwell – double bass
 Rosie Danvers – brass arrangement, cello, leader, string arrangements, string engineer
 Robin Finck – guitar
 Fraser T Smith – bass, composer, guitar, keyboards, producer
 Bradley Hagen – drums
 Vincent Henry – horn
 Sally Herbert – string arrangements
 Sally Jackson – violin
 Bryony James – cello
 Kotono Sato – violin
 Philip Lawrence – composer, background vocals
 Tommy Lee – drums
 Ari Levine – composer, musician
 Mason Levy – musician

 Mike Lovatt – trumpet
 Jacob Lutrell – musician
 Bruno Mars – composer, musician
 Danny Marsden – trumpet
 Eleanor Mathieson – violin
 Howard McGill – baritone saxophone
 Jeremy Morris – violin
 Emma Owens – viola
 Pino Palladino – bass
 Kerenza Peacock – violin
 Ruston Pomeroy – violin
 Hayley Pomfrett – violin
 Tony Reyes – composer, bass
 Jenny Sacha – violin
 Kotono Sato – violin
 Ash Soan – drums
 Ayak Thiik – background vocals
 Peter Tomasso – brass arrangement
 Nikolaj Torplarsen – musician
 Bruce White – viola
 Martin Williams – tenor saxophone
 Jerry Wonder – musician
 John Wicks - composer, drummer

Production 

 Niall Acott – engineer
 Ben H. Allen – composer, engineer, mixing, producer
 Beatriz Artola – engineer
 Steven Barlow – engineer
 Creighton Barrett – composer
 Chris Baseford – engineer
 Benjamin Birdwell – composer
 Julian Broad – photography
 Paul Brown – A&R
 Hitesh Ceon – producer, composer, engineer, musician
 Mack David – composer
 Tom Elmhirst – mixing
 Paul Epworth – musician, producer
 noel fisher – composer
 Robert Gardner – assistant
 Chris Gehringer – mastering
 The Grey Area – producer
 James Hampton – composer
 Mike Jackson – A&R
 Craig Kallman – executive producer

 Alan Kasirye – composer
 Jerry Livingston – composer
 Erik Madrid – assistant
 Manny Marroquin – mixing
 Graham Marsh – engineer, mixing, percussion, producer, programming, vocal producer
 K.C. "Cognac" Morton – executive producer
 Alan Nglish – producer
 Rick Nowels – composer, vocal producer
 Kim Ofstad – producer, composer, engineer, musician
 Dan Parry – engineer
 Christian Plata – assistant
 Steve Price – engineer
 Mark Rankin – engineer
 John Martin – assistant engineer
 Salaam Remi – bass, composer, guitar, horn arrangements, producer, string arrangements
 Stephen Coleman - string arrangements
 Anthony Kronfle – assistant engineer
 Isabel Seeliger-Morley – assistant, engineer
 Terrence Simpkins – additional production, composer
 The Smeezingtons – producer
 Fraser T Smith – composer, producer, musician
 Jack Splash – composer, producer

Charts

Weekly charts

Year-end charts

Decade-end charts

Certifications

Release history

References

External links 
 
 The Lady Killer at Discogs

2010 albums
Albums produced by Fraser T. Smith
Albums produced by Jack Splash
Albums produced by Paul Epworth
Albums produced by Salaam Remi
Albums produced by the Smeezingtons
CeeLo Green albums
Elektra Records albums